Black-Box (stylized in all caps) is a Japanese manga series written and illustrated by Tsutomu Takahashi. It was serialized in Kodansha's seinen manga magazine Monthly Afternoon from June 2015 to March 2019, with its chapters collected in six tankōbon volumes.

Publication
Written and illustrated by Tsutomu Takahashi, Black-Box was serialized in Kodansha's seinen manga magazine Monthly Afternoon from June 25, 2015, to March 25, 2019. Kodansha collected its chapters in six tankōbon volumes, released from

Volume list

Reception
Black-Box was one of the Jury Recommended Works at the 21st Japan Media Arts Festival in 2018.

References

Further reading

External links
 

Boxing in anime and manga
Kodansha manga
Seinen manga